Lewisohn is a surname. Notable people with the surname include:

Adolph Lewisohn, (1849-1938), German-American merchant and philanthropist
Leonard Lewisohn (philanthropist) (1847-1902), German-American merchant and philanthropist, brother of Adolph
Alice Lewisohn, (1883-1972), American co-founder of Neighborhood Playhouse and actress, daughter of Leonard
Irene Lewisohn (1892-1944), American co-founder of Neighborhood Playhouse and the Museum of Costume Art, daughter of Leonard
Jesse Lewisohn (1872-1918), American businessman and racehorse owner, son of Leonard
Ludwig Lewisohn (1882–1955), German-American writer
Mark Lewisohn (born 1958), British author and historian
Leonard Lewisohn (Islamic scholar)

See also 
Lewisohn Stadium, NYC
Lewysohn
Levison
Lewisson

German-language surnames
Jewish surnames
Levite surnames
Yiddish-language surnames
Patronymic surnames